Sherlock Holmes and Doctor Watson may refer to:

Film
 Sherlock Holmes and Dr. Watson, a 1979 Soviet film adaptation of Arthur Conan Doyle's novels
The Adventures of Sherlock Holmes and Dr. Watson the entire series of adaptations

Television
 Sherlock Holmes and Doctor Watson, a 1979 television series

See also
 Holmes and Watson (disambiguation)